Filipino boy band BGYO has released two studio album, thirteen singles, seven B-sides, nine soundtrack singles, two promotional singles, two remix singles and eleven music videos.

The group debuted in the Philippines on January 29, 2021, with the single "The Light". That same year, they released an original soundtrack "He's Into Her" as part of the series "He's Into Her", which led them to be the fifth Filipino artist to appear on the weekly Billboard's Next Big Sound chart at number 2; also recognized as the "Best Theme Song or Title Theme" at the 2021 Asian Academy Creative Awards and a summer-themed song for their network's special station ID "Feel Good Pilipinas". Weeks after, BGYO released two promotional singles "Runnin'" and "While We Are Young" as part of the 4th Season of Coke Studio Philippines' Itodo Mo Beat Mo. In August 2021, BGYO released "The Baddest" as their sophomore single which brought BGYO in the weekly Billboard's Next Big Sound chart at number one, the first Filipino act, to do so. "Kulay" was released on September 23, 2021, as a theme song of the Miss Universe Philippines 2021 National Costume Competition In October 2021, the group released their debut album The Light, which includes "The Light", "The Baddest", "He's Into Her"; five new songs "When I'm with You", "Kundiman", "Sabay", "Fly Away" and "Rocketman", four international versions of "The Light"—Bahasa Indonesia, Thai, Spanish and Japanese; and has achieved the coveted feat of being the longest consecutive charting album by a Filipino act to stay at number one on iTunes Philippines of all time. In November 2021, the group took part on the official Christmas theme song of ABS CBN's Christmas Station ID alongside other Filipino artists, entitled "Andito Tayo Para sa Isa't Isa".

In the first quarter of 2022, BGYO released three original soundtracks "Mahal Na Kita", "Up!" and "Best Time" In June 2022, three of their songs—"Kundiman", "He's Into Her", "The Baddest"—were chosen to be part of The Lunar Codex's "Polaris Collection" time capsules bound to the Moon in 2023. In the second quarter of 2022, BGYO released their first original single, since October 2021, that is not a part of the original soundtrack named "Tumitigil Ang Mundo". In August 2022, the group released the original soundtrack of Darna (2022 TV series) entitled "Patuloy Lang Ang Lipad". To support their second album Be Us, the group released "Magnet and "PNGNP". In November 2022, the group delivered an extraordinary feat of having 2 albums and 32 tracks on iTunes Philippines Charts at the same time, the first Filipino act to do so. Two weeks after, Tumitigil Ang Mundo became part of the EP—An Inconvenient Love Original Soundtrack.

Studio albums

Singles

As lead artist

Promotional singles

Collaborations

Remixes

See also
Star Music discography
2021 in Philippine music
2022 in Philippine music

Notes

References 

Discography
Discographies of Filipino artists
Hip hop discographies
Pop music group discographies
Pop music discographies
Rhythm and blues discographies